Pselliopus cinctus is a species of assassin bug in the family Reduviidae. It is found in North America.

References

Further reading

External links

 

Reduviidae
Articles created by Qbugbot
Insects described in 1776
Taxa named by Johan Christian Fabricius